The Incorrigible (Spanish: La incorregible) is a 1931 film directed by Leo Mittler and starring Enriqueta Serrano, Tony D'Algy and Gabriel Algara. Made at the Joinville Studios in Paris, it is the Spanish-language version of the 1930 American film Manslaughter. Such multi-language versions were common in the early years of film. Paramount Pictures also made French, German and Swedish versions of the film.

Cast
 Enriqueta Serrano as Evelyn  
 Tony D'Algy as Roy O'Bannon  
 Gabriel Algara as Albee  
 Marita Ángeles as Elinor  
 Ricardo Baroja as Mason  
 Carmen Muñoz as Mary  
 Francisco Gómez Ferrer as Detective 
 Antonia Arévalo
 Manuel Bernardos
 Antonio Gentil
 Alfonso Granada
 Rafaela Lozano

References

Bibliography 
 Jorge Finkielman. The Film Industry in Argentina: An Illustrated Cultural History. McFarland, 2003.

External links 
 

1931 films
1930s Spanish-language films
Spanish-language American films
Films directed by Leo Mittler
Films shot at Joinville Studios
American multilingual films
1931 drama films
American drama films
American black-and-white films
Films based on works by Alice Duer Miller
1931 multilingual films
1930s American films